Dughata  (also written Doghata, Dughat, Doghan or Dokhata,) is a village located in the Tel Kaif District of the Ninawa Governorate in northern Iraq. The village is located ca.  south of Alqosh and ca.  north of Telskuf in the Nineveh Plains. It belongs to the disputed territories of Northern Iraq.

Dughata has an exclusively Yazidi population.

References

Populated places in Nineveh Governorate
Yazidi populated places in Iraq